The name Hurricane Three can reference to three different hurricanes:

 Hurricane Three (1891), a Category 3 hurricane that made landfall in Martinique
 Hurricane Three (1935), a Category 5 hurricane that made landfall in Florida with the lowest recorded barometric pressure in the United States
 Hurricane Three (1940), a Category 2 hurricane that made landfall in the South Carolina and Georgia Coast

Atlantic hurricane set index articles